"Mr. Brightside" is the debut single of American rock band the Killers. It is taken from their debut studio album, Hot Fuss (2004). Written by band members Brandon Flowers and Dave Keuning, it was one of the first songs the Killers ever wrote. Two music videos were made for the song: the first one was shot in black and white and features the band performing in an empty room. The second one, based on the 2001 film Moulin Rouge!, was filmed for the song's re-release.

The song was first released on September 29, 2003. It became more popular upon its re-release in 2004, peaking at number 10 in both the United States and the United Kingdom. It is the Killers' best-selling song in the US, where it has sold over 3.5 million copies. In the United Kingdom it has also sold over 3.52 million copies and is the longest-charting single on the UK Singles Chart Top 100, having spent 349 weeks (6 years, 8 months) on the chart as of February 23, 2023 and is the most streamed track released prior to 2010. It is also one of the top fifteen most downloaded rock tracks ever in the United Kingdom.

"Mr. Brightside" was named "Song of the Decade" by UK radio stations Absolute Radio and XFM, and in April 2010 Last.fm revealed that it was the most-listened-to track since the launch of the online music service, with the track being played over 7.66 million times. It is the 2nd most streamed song on Spotify from the 2000s. In October 2010, it was voted ninth in the Greatest Guitar Riffs of the 21st Century so far by Total Guitar magazine. Additionally, in 2010 Rolling Stone listed "Mr. Brightside" as the 48th-best song of the 21st century, also, in 2021, it was ranked number 378 on Rolling Stone's "500 Greatest Songs of All Time".

Recording and production

Lyrically, "Mr. Brightside" depicts a true story of Flowers' jealousy and paranoia when he walked into a bar in Las Vegas and found his girlfriend cheating on him. "I was asleep and I knew something was wrong," he said. "I have these instincts. I went to the Crown and Anchor, a bar in Vegas, and my girlfriend was there with another guy."

Guitarist Dave Keuning composed the music before meeting Flowers. Flowers then wrote lyrics and composed the chorus after hearing Keuning's ideas. Flowers credits the speed of the song's creation to its having only one verse. He says, "We went in and made demos pretty quickly after that, and it took a ton of time. That's also why there's not a second verse... I just didn't have any other lines, and it ended up sticking." Drummer Ronnie Vannucci Jr. is credited with creating the fast-paced drum beat in the first twenty-two seconds. The "calling a cab" section of the song has both a musical and textual similarity to the middle section of the song "Queen Bitch" from David Bowie's album Hunky Dory (1971). "Mr. Brightside" is written in the atypical key of D major.

The song was mixed for its inclusion on Hot Fuss by Mark Needham, along with business partners Braden Merrick and Jeff Saltzman. The song was first created as a reference mix in just over half an hour "on an 8 input console, with no automation" according to Needham. Despite several subsequent remixes, the members of the Killers preferred the original one, which then made it onto the record. In recording the vocal effects, Saltzman used Echo Farm, sticking with the default vocal effects setting. Needham says it "overdrives the vocal a bit and sets an 84 ms delay."

History
In their first performance together as the Killers, Flowers and Keuning played "Mr. Brightside" as part of a two-song open-mic night set at Las Vegas' Cafe Roma. Of the performance, Flowers says "It was terrible, awful." In November 2001, the group had recorded "Mr. Brightside" along with three other demos including "Desperate", "Replaceable", and "Under the Gun" at Mike Sak's Kill the Messenger Studio in Henderson, Nevada. They handed out a demo of the song for free during their shows in 2002. After signing with UK indie label Lizard King Records, the track was sent to radio as a buzz single and it received frequent spins by BBC Radio 1 DJ's Zane Lowe and Steve Lamacq as well as being play-listed by XFM. Just one week after its April release, MTV2 secured a deal to air the song for a week.

The Killers performed the song live on the rooftop of Caesars Palace during halftime of the Las Vegas Raiders' first-ever home game at Allegiant Stadium on September 21, 2020; the halftime show was broadcast on U.S. television on ESPN & ABC's simulcast coverage of Monday Night Football.

Reception
In one of the song's first reviews, The Washington Post stated, "dashing through the tune as if it were a power ballad on speed, Flowers and company had the capacity crowd pulsing along with glee." "Mr. Brightside" became a popular song within the Las Vegas music scene with one reviewer calling it a "feel-good anthem that ranks as one of the best local tracks in a long time". In positive reviews, NME said the song was filled with "ambition, sex, and noise" while Rolling Stone described the song as having "swelled with anthemic majesty". The Guardian considered "Mr. Brightside" to be the most overplayed song, and noted that it has been played "on the radio. In the supermarket. In the pub. The office. In a cab. Thrumming through your neighbours' wall. [...] Blasted out at every party or wedding you’ll attend for the rest of your life." In 2020, Paste ranked the song number three on their list of the 20 greatest Killers songs, and in 2021, American Songwriter ranked the song number one on their list of the 10 greatest Killers songs.

Commercial performance
"Mr. Brightside" entered the Billboard Hot 100 at No. 40 on February 12, 2005, and peaked at No. 10 on June 11, thus making it a sleeper hit. The song reached 3.5 million in sales in 2016.

In 2005, "Mr. Brightside" was the sixth most downloaded song on iTunes. To this day "Mr. Brightside" still has the highest popularity rating that iTunes offers, even after being available for purchase for over ten years. Additionally, sales of Hot Fuss album reached over 5 million sales by 2006. The online music streaming service Last.fm reported in 2010 that "Mr. Brightside" was the most downloaded song on the website. By July 2014, the song sold more than 820,000 copies in the United Kingdom, making it the UK's No. 12 most downloaded rock track of all time.

As of April 2021, "Mr. Brightside" has spent 260 non-consecutive weeks, or five years, on the UK Singles Chart, the most out of any song. , it had charted on the UK Singles Chart in 11 of the last 13 years, including a 35-week run peaking at number 49 in 2016–2017. It was the UK's most streamed pre-2010 song, until it was surpassed by Oasis' "Wonderwall" in late 2018, and continued to be purchased for download hundreds of times a week by 2017. In March 2018, the song reached the milestone of staying in the Top 100 of the UK Singles Chart for 200 weeks. Explanations have included the song's popularity at parties, its popularity on streaming services, and the continued presence of the Killers as a popular live band in the UK. According to the Official Charts Company, the song has been streamed 281 million times in the UK and has sold 3,520,000 copies there as of April 2021.

Music videos
There are two videos for this song: the first version (also known as the UK version) was filmed in Staten Island, New York, and was directed by Brad and Brian Palmer under their studio Surround. Later on in the year the label decided to create a more mainstream video for the US market: the second video (also known as the US version) was filmed in Los Angeles, California. Directed by Sophie Muller, the video stars Flowers, Izabella Miko, and Eric Roberts in a love triangle, occurring within the context of a burlesque show.

The US version won an MTV VMA in 2005 for Best New Artist in a Video, beating other nominees such as John Legend, Ciara, The Game, and My Chemical Romance.
The photos featured on the inner sleeve of the album Hot Fuss were shot on set during the filming of the UK version music video and were inspired by the black and white look of that video.

Releases and cover versions
In 2005, Stuart Price released a remix of the song under his pseudonym Jacques Lu Cont. Reviewers were generally negative: for example, Michael Paoletta said this version "depletes the song of its energy and intensity". That same year, this song as well as two others by the Killers (Smile Like You Mean It and Somebody Told Me) reached the Billboard Top 20 single chart. An extended version of the Stuart Price remix of the song was featured on the Killers' 2007 B-side and rarities compilation, Sawdust. During the tour for Brandon Flowers's solo record, he performed the remix version with Stuart Price during his show at Brixton Academy and has since performed it on his tour as the show closer, again in the remix form.

An early demo of the song featured Dave Keuning on bass and Matt Norcross on drums, before Mark Stoermer and Ronnie Vannucci were members of the band. The original demo was officially released on the 2013 compilation album Direct Hits. On the Killers' 2012 album Battle Born, they released "Miss Atomic Bomb", which is considered a companion song to "Mr. Brightside" lyrically.

The song has been covered in a swing/jazz style by Paul Anka on his 2007 covers album Classic Songs, My Way. Crossover rock-jazz artist ELEW created a piano version for his 2010 ELEW Rockjazz Vol. 1. English pop-punk band McFly covered the song as a B-side to their 2005 single "I Wanna Hold You". Texan artist Playradioplay! covered the song on his 2007 EP The Frequency as well. An acoustic bluegrass cover was recorded for CMH Records' Bluegrass Tribute to The Killers. Abi Sampa from The Voice UK recorded a mashup of "Mr. Brightside" and M.I.A.'s "Paper Planes". Many other artists have performed live covers of the song, including American rock band Fall Out Boy, Chris Daughtry at The Masked Singer USA, Isa Raja on X Factor Indonesia and Scottish singer-songwriter Amy Macdonald.

The song has also been covered by the Vitamin String Quartet, Boyce Avenue and on the UK television show Orange Unsigned Act by contestant Tommy Reilly. Additionally, a cappella versions have been produced by groups including Wheaton College's Gentlemen Callers, MIT's Resonance and Boston-based Overboard. Flowers performed the song during his solo tour in 2010. Indonesian hardcore band Thirteen also covered this song. The Wanted covered the song as part of a medley of the Killers songs during their summer 2013 live shows. Kelly Clarkson covered the version live on The Kelly Clarkson Show. An acoustic version of the song covered by British singer-songwriter Charlotte Campbell was played during Love Island series 7 in 2021.

Legacy
"Mr. Brightside" was first played during an episode of the second season of the drama series The O.C. back in 2004, just a few months after its re-issue. Fast forward two years, it appeared on the soundtrack for the 2006 film The Holiday. The song is played on a CD player by the character Amanda Woods, portrayed by Cameron Diaz, in order to relieve stress and forget about her boyfriend's infidelity. The song is also briefly featured in the 2013 film About Time and Rabbit Without Ears. The song is the opening theme to the 2005 TV documentary Jamie’s School Dinners and the 2020 BBC Wales mini-documentary A Special School.

The song has become a crowd favorite among Michigan Wolverines football fans at Michigan Stadium, where fans in excess of 100,000 sing along to the tune when it is played in the fourth quarter. The 2017 football season saw the song being sung in unison by the student SuperFans at Alumni Stadium during Boston College Eagles football games, and has become the unofficial go-to song for Boston College fans during sporting events. It was also a memorable feature of the 2017 AFL premiership celebrations by Jack Riewoldt of the Richmond Tigers, who sang the song in its entirety live alongside the Killers.

British singer James Blunt has said that "Mr. Brightside" is his favorite song of all time. In 2008, it was released as downloadable content (DLC) for the Rock Band series. It is one of the all-time highest-selling DLC songs for the game.

In the UK TV series Bloods, the lead characters sing along to Mr. Brightside in the car in the opening episode of series 2.

Accolades
 BPI Pop Gem Hall of Fame Inductee (2014)
 Vevo Certified Over 200 Million Views (2017)

Awards
The song was nominated for a Grammy in 2006 for Best Pop Performance by a Duo or Group with Vocal, but lost to a live version of "This Love" by Maroon 5.

Track listings

UK 7-inch white vinyl (2003)
A. "Mr Brightside"
B. "Smile Like You Mean It"

UK limited-edition CD single (2003)
 "Mr Brightside"
 "Smile Like You Mean It"
 "On Top"
 "Who Let You Go?"

UK limited-edition 7-inch red vinyl single (2004)
A. "Mr Brightside"
B. "Who Let You Go?"

UK CD1 (2004)
 "Mr Brightside" (radio edit)
 "Change Your Mind"

UK CD2 (2004)
 "Mr Brightside" (album version)
 "Somebody Told Me" (Insider remix)
 "Midnight Show" (SBN live session)
 "Mr Brightside" (enhanced video section)

US promo CD (2004)
 "Mr. Brightside" (single version)

Australian limited-edition enhanced CD single (2004)
 "Mr Brightside"
 "Somebody Told Me" (Josh Harris remix radio edit)
 "Who Let You Go?"
 "Mr Brightside" (video)

European CD single (2004)
 "Mr Brightside" – 3:42
 "Somebody Told Me" (Insider remix) – 5:00

European enhanced maxi-single (2004)
 "Mr Brightside" – 3:42
 "Somebody Told Me" (Insider remix) – 5:00
 "Mr Brightside" (Jacques Lu Cont's Thin White Duke mix) – 8:48
 "Mr Brightside" (original version video)

US 2×12-inch vinyl (2005)
A. "Mr. Brightside" (Jacques Lu Cont's Thin White Duke remix)
B. "Mr. Brightside" (The Lindbergh Palace club remix)
C. "Mr. Brightside" (Jacques Lu Cont's Thin White Duke dub)
D1. "Mr. Brightside" (The Lindbergh Palace radio remix)
D2. "Mr. Brightside" (The Lindbergh Palace dub)

Charts

Weekly charts

Year-end charts

Decade-end charts

Certifications

Release history

See also
 List of best-selling singles in Australia

References

External links
 

2003 songs
2003 debut singles
2004 singles
The Killers songs
Music videos directed by Sophie Muller
Songs written by Brandon Flowers
Songs written by Dave Keuning
Island Records singles
Black-and-white music videos
Songs about infidelity
Songs about jealousy
UK Independent Singles Chart number-one singles